Mazzuchelli is a surname. Notable people with the surname include:

Pier Francesco Mazzucchelli (il Morazzone), 17th century Milanese painter
Samuel Charles Mazzuchelli, 19th century frontier missionary
Giammaria Mazzucchelli, Italian historian
David Mazzucchelli, American comic book artist and illustrator